The ōmao (Myadestes obscurus), also called the Hawaiian thrush, is an endemic species of robin-like bird found only on the island of Hawaii. Ōmao are closely related to the other endemic thrushes of the Hawaiian Islands, the kāmao, the olomao, and the puaiohi. Ōmao are found primarily in rainforests in the eastern and southeastern regions of the Big Island. Population estimates approximate 170,000 birds, making it the most common of the Hawaiian thrushes. It appears to have a stable population, but because the entire population exists on a small range and is endemic to a single island, it is considered vulnerable.

Description

Adult thrushes (males and females are similar in appearance) are mostly nondescript, with a grayish-brown head transitioning to a pale gray below. The back and primaries are a dull olive brown.  They also have whitish vents and undertail coverts.   The juveniles are also similarly dull in coloration, but have pale whitish-buff spotting on the wing coverts.

Behaviour
‘Ōma’os are mostly frugivores, but will take insects or other small invertebrates.
The bird has a song that is a set of jerky liquid notes, whip-per-weeo-whip-per-weet. Their many calls include a catlike rasp, a frog like croak and even a high pitched police whistle type sound. During breeding, the birds make a bulky nest in a tree or tree fern, laying one to three bluish eggs inside.

Habitat
The ‘ōma’o once lived on most of the land of Hawaii. Today it is restricted to the southern and eastern slopes of the island, mostly above 1,000 meters above sea level, 25 to 30 percent of its ancestral habitat. Its preferred habitat is rainforest, but can be found in high shrublands on Mauna Loa. Preferred trees include the ohia and koa.  The Hawaiian thrush avoids areas with banana poka (an invasive vine). In lower elevations, it appears to be gaining a natural resistance to avian malaria.  Threats to this species include habitat destruction from housing, tourism development and farming; introduced feral animal predation (mainly rats, cats and mongoose); invasive plant encroachment; and feral livestock such as goats and pigs.

The species has been aided by several conservation actions. These include the removal of pigs from several areas in the 1990s, such as Hakalau Forest National Wildlife Refuge, and the control of rats, cats, and ungulates.

The ‘ōma’o was first described to Western science in 1789 by Gmelin.

References

Birdlife Species Factsheet
Handbook of the Birds of the World Vol 10,  Josep del Hoyo editor,

External links
ARKive-O'mao images
O'mao videos, photos, and sounds on the Internet Bird Collection

Myadestes
Endemic birds of Hawaii
Birds described in 1789
Taxa named by Johann Friedrich Gmelin